İbrahim Arat (born December 2, 1988, in Izmir, Turkey) is a Turkish  weightlifter competing in the –94 kg division.

At the 2011 Summer Universiade held in Shenzhen, China, he became bronze medalist.

Arat qualified for participation at the 2012 Summer Olympics  but was withdrawn after his A-sample tested positive for hydroxystanozolol during a drug test. He was suspended for 2 years.

Achievements

References

1988 births
Sportspeople from İzmir
Living people
Turkish male weightlifters
Izmir Büyükşehir Belediyespor athletes
Doping cases in weightlifting
Universiade medalists in weightlifting
Universiade bronze medalists for Turkey
21st-century Turkish people